is a 1986 Japanese adult animated post-apocalyptic martial arts film based on the manga of the same name. It was produced by Toei Animation, the same studio who worked on the TV series that was airing at the time, with the same cast and crew working on both projects. Unlike the TV series, the movie is not a direct adaptation of the manga, but instead tells an alternate story that rearranges characters and plot elements from the manga's first 75 chapters. However, the film retains the more violent content of the original manga, which the television series lacked.

Plot 
A global nuclear war has turned most of Earth into a contaminated wasteland, with humanity's survivors now fighting over the few uncontaminated food and water supplies still remaining. Kenshiro, a master of the deadly martial art Hokuto Shinken, is traveling with his fiancee Yuria when they are confronted by a gang led by Ken's former friend Shin, a master of the rival Nanto Seiken style. Shin proclaims that he has been in love with Yuria for a long time and, with no law to intervene now, challenges Ken over her. After defeating Ken in combat, Shin engraves seven wounds on Ken's chest and leaves him for dead, taking Yuria with him. Ken's eldest brother-in-training Raoh, having witnessed the fight without intervening, returns to his dojo, where he finds his sensei Ryuken meditating. Raoh challenges Ryuken's decision to choose Ken as the Hokuto Shinken successor over him and kills him, proclaiming he will become the ruler of the new world.

A year passes and Ken now wanders the wasteland as a hero who protects the weak and innocent from those who prey on them. He rescues a couple of young children named Bat and Lin from a gang of bandits and allies himself with another Nanto Seiken master named Rei, who is searching for his kidnapped sister Airi. Ken learns that Airi's kidnapper is none other than Jagi, another former brother-in-training who has been impersonating Ken in an attempt to tarnish his reputation and draw him out. Ken heads to Jagi's hideout and defeats him, rescuing Airi in the process. Before he dies a gruesome death, Jagi reveals that he was the one who convinced Shin to betray Ken and that he is now living with Yuria in his stronghold, the city of Southern Cross.

Elsewhere, Raoh, now a conqueror known as Ken-oh (King of Fists), has amassed a huge army, expanding his domain by defeating rival warlords and begins heading to Southern Cross. There, Yuria is treated with a life of luxury, living under the rule of Shin, who now leads his own army as well. However, Yuria refuses Shin's gifts of affection, longing to be reunited with Ken. When she overhears that Ken is still alive, she attempts to sneak out of the city, only to be taken captive by Raoh, who challenges Shin to a fight to the death. A while later, Kenshiro arrives at Southern Cross, only to find the city in flames and Shin's soldiers dead. Shin is still alive and fights Ken, but the battle does not last long, as Shin has already suffered a mortal wound from his encounter with Raoh. Before dying, Shin tells Ken that Raoh has taken Yuria captive and has headed to Cassandra, the City of Wailing Demons.

Lin arrives at Cassandra along with Bat and Rei, where they witness Raoh's army marching through the streets. Lin sees Yuria being held by Raoh's men during the parade and decides to break into Raoh's dungeon later that night with Bat. The two meet Yuria in her cell and leave her with a plant grown from a seed Yuria gave to Ken before leaving. The plant catches Raoh's attention and Yuria is immediately sentenced to a public execution the following morning. Rei challenges Raoh, but he proves to be no match for him. Ken rushes to Cassandra, but arrives too late to stop Raoh from inflicting a mortal wound on Rei. After Rei dies, Kenshiro and Raoh unleash their full fighting aura to battle each other, destroying most of Cassandra in the process and leaving both substantially injured. With the two exhausted of all their power and strength, Raoh manages to knock Ken unconscious. However, before Raoh can deliver the finishing blow, Lin interrupts the fight and implores him to spare Ken's life. Raoh agrees to Lin's request and walks away, swearing to postpone the battle for another day. Ken leaves Lin and Bat, and continues his search for Yuria, who mysteriously vanished during the final battle.

Cast

Soundtrack

Releases

Japanese 
Hokuto no Ken was released in Japan on VHS in 1988, two years after its theatrical release. The late release was due to the decision to animate a new ending. Unlike the theatrical version, in which Kenshiro falls unconscious during the final battle, the revised ending has both fighters still standing when they're about to deliver their mutual finishing blows before they're interrupted by Lin. The movie was later released in Japan on Laserdisc on September 21, 1995.

On November 21, 2008, the movie was released on DVD for the first time in Japan with a remastered high definition transfer. This new version of the film included the theatrical cut for the first time on Japanese home video (albeit, only for the first print run). Because the revised ending was recorded on a different film stock, it did not undergo the remastering process, resulting in a drop in video quality when the scene is played.

International 
The English-dubbed version, produced by Carl Macek, was first released on VHS in 1991 in North America by Streamline Pictures and in 1994 in the United Kingdom and Australia by Manga Entertainment. The English script, written by Tom Wyner, is not a direct translation of the Japanese original, resulting in drastic plot differences between the two versions (such as the explanation for Airi's blindness and the cause of Shin's death). The theatrical ending was used for this version and the end credits theme, "Purple Eyes", is played without vocals. The English dub was given an early DVD release in North America by Image Entertainment in 1998.

A version of the Italian dub that was released on VHS by Granata Press in 1993 under the title Ken il Guerriero was based on a workprint cut which features some of the violent scenes that are blurred out in the Japanese theatrical version (such as the scene in which Shin engraves the seven scars on Kenshiro's chest) without any discoloration or blurring. It also features a scene in which Dogmaster Galf (a minor villain from the manga who makes a cameo in the movie leading Raoh's march with a megaphone) crushes the head of a chanter with his bare hands.

Discotek Media released the movie on Region 1 DVD in May 2009, based on the high definition video transfer produced by Toei for the previous year's Japanese DVD release. It features both, the original Japanese dialogue and the English dub, as well as most of the extra features except for the revised ending. Because the video transfer is the same one used by the Japanese version, the text used for the title, intertitles and credits, are in Japanese, even though these were previously changed for the VHS release of the English dub. The first-print run of the DVD featured several translation mistakes on the subtitles. Later prints of the DVD (which used a different cover artwork) contain corrected subtitles.

Reception 
The English dub version of the movie was released two years after Viz Communications' short-lived first translation of the manga, and received mixed reviews. Upon release, Richard Harrington of The Washington Post criticized the violent nature of the movie and quality of the animation, saying that "watching it you will feel as comfortable as a hemophiliac in a razor blade factory". Stephen Holden of The New York Times wrote that "in its carelessly translated and poorly dubbed English adaptation, the characters express themselves in diction so stiff that they seem ludicrously prissy". In 2005, a review from Akemi's Anime World called it "so bad it's good, and the original in the genre" and calls quality of the dub "cheesy", but "suitable".

The 1996 movie guide "Seen That, Now What?", the animated film was given the rating of "C", in which it is described as having a good story and impressive post-apocalyptic background scenery, being offset by stiff character animation and excessively gory violence.

American Wrestler John Cena has said that Fist of the North Star is his favourite anime movie.

Notes

References

External links

 
 
User Reviews at Flixster

1986 films
1986 anime films
1986 martial arts films
1980s science fiction action films
Anime films based on manga
Discotek Media
Films directed by Toyoo Ashida
Films set in the future
Fist of the North Star films
Japanese animated science fiction films
Japanese post-apocalyptic films
Japanese martial arts films
Animated post-apocalyptic films
Japanese adult animated films
Japanese splatter films
Toei Animation films
Films scored by Katsuhisa Hattori